Mugling (sometimes known as Muglin) is a town in Chitwan, Bagmati Province, Nepal. 

Mugling is located at an interchange of two majors highways: Prithvi and Madan Ashrit Highway (also known as Mugling-Narayanghat Highway). Before the 1970s, Mugling was a fishing village at the confluence of Marshyangdi River and Trishuli River. Soon after the two highways were connected, the town saw a major transformation and became synonymised as a "town that never slept". 

In 2005, it was reported that Mugling became like a ghost town due to the Nepalese Civil War, rising violence, and crime. During the war, the Nepal government had installed an army checkpoint at the market.

References 

Populated places in Chitwan District
Towns in Nepal